Nakhuti is a village in the Hojai district of Assam, India. Its revenue division is Lanka. 

Villages in Nagaon district